Eugene Leon Crumling (April 5, 1922 – February 11, 2012) was a backup catcher in Major League Baseball who played for the St. Louis Cardinals during the 1945 season.

Crumling was one of many ballplayers who only appeared in the majors during World War II. He joined the Cardinals late in the 1945 season, as part of a catching tandem that included Ken O'Dea, Del Rice and Walker Cooper. He posted a .083 batting average in six games.

He also played for eight Minor league teams from 1941 through 1952, hitting a .236 average in 895 games.

Besides this, he managed for three seasons in the Interstate League (1948, 1951) and the Pennsylvania–Ontario–New York League (1952).

Crumling died in Yorkana, Pennsylvania, at the age of 89.

Sources

Major League Baseball catchers
St. Louis Cardinals players
Minor league baseball managers
Allentown Wings players
Columbus Red Birds players
Elmira Pioneers players
Hagerstown Owls players
Rochester Red Wings players
Sunbury A's players
Wellsville Rockets players
York White Roses players
Baseball players from Pennsylvania
People from York County, Pennsylvania
1922 births
2012 deaths